Watts Park, also known as West Park, is an urban park in the city of Southampton. It is named in honour of Isaac Watts, the Congregationalist minister and hymn writer who was born in the city. It was built between 1854 and 1866, and in 1995 was designated Grade II* on Historic England's register of historic parks and gardens.

History and description

The parks in the city of Southampton, including Watts Park, were laid out between 1854 and 1866. Watts Park is bounded by Cumberland Place and Commercial Road in the centre of the city, and is across from the Southampton Civic Centre. The park is named in honour of Isaac Watts, the hymn writer who was born in Southampton in 1614. The memorial statue to Watts was erected in 1861; every day, at 8:00 a.m., noon, and 4:00 p.m., the Civic Centre clock chimes one of his hymns, "Our God, Our Help in Ages Past". The park is also the site for the city's cenotaph by Edwin Lutyens, commemorating the dead of the First World War and subsequent conflicts.

The park is designated Grade II* on Historic England's register of historic parks and gardens. It is listed as part of a collection of Southampton's "Central Parks", comprising Watts Park, East Park, Palmerston Park, Houndwell Park, and Hoglands Park. The parks were listed in 1995, with Historic England noting that they are "an early example of municipal parks", with designs that are "unchanged from their original layout which developed in the 1840s and 1850s". Historic England also noted their historic nature, with a "rich time-depth, formerly having been part of the town’s Lammas lands", and the presence of "numerous listed structures, including the town's war memorial".

References

Geography of Southampton
Parks and open spaces in Hampshire
Tourist attractions in Southampton